Mediocre (a term defined as "having no peculiar or outstanding features") and mediocrity (the condition of being mediocre) may also refer to:

Mediocre 
 Mediocre (album), 2008 album by Ximena Sariñana 
 Mediocre American Man Trilogy, three films starring Will Ferrell 
 "Mediocre Bad Guys", a song on the 2003 album On and On by Jack Johnson 
 Mediocre Generica, the 2001 debut album by the American punk band Leftöver Crack

Mediocrity 
 Mediocrity (advertising campaign), launched in 2011 by Subaru of America to represent the blandness of mid-size sedans
 "Mediocrity Gets You Pears (The Shaker)", a song on the 2005 album Searching for a Former Clarity by Florida punk rock band Against Me!  
 Mediocrity principle, a philosophical notion set forth by André Kukla in 2009

See also 
 Mediocracy, a book by Fabian Tassano critiquing modern life